Visakhapatnam central prison ' is a correctional facility in Adavivaram, Visakhapatnam, Andhra Pradesh, India.

References 

Prisons in Andhra Pradesh
Buildings and structures in Visakhapatnam
Uttarandhra